Dalidaivis Rodriguez Clark is a Cuban judoka who competes for her country, winning the gold medal in the  category at both the 2012 and 2016 Paralympic Games.

Career
Dalidaivis Rodriguez Clark suffers from keratoconus, a degenerative disease which slowly reduces her ability to see. She trains with able bodied Cuban judokas, and does not use anything to improve her vision while doing so to prepare for competition conditions. She competed in Judo in the  category at the 2011 Parapan American Games in Guadalajara, Mexico. Clark won the gold medal at the 2012 Summer Paralympics in London, England. In 2014, Clark at the International Blind Sports Federation Judo World Cup in Colorado Springs, United States. At the time, she had a heavy cold, but fought regardless, defeating Sweden's Nicolina Pernheim, Finland's Paivi Tolppanen and China's Tong Zhou in the semi-final. She was defeated by the Ukrainian Iryna Husieva in the final.

Prior to the 2016 Summer Paralympics in Rio de Janeiro, Brazil, Clark spoke of her desire to fight Husieva once again. She credited a second victory at the Parapan American Games in the 2015 Toronto Games as being one of the key points of her build up to the Paralympics. Clark was selected as the flag bearer for the Cuban team at during the 2016 Summer Paralympics opening ceremony. Due to her victory at the 2012 Games, she was seeded into the semi-finals for the Judo tournament. She defeated Songlee Jin of South Korea, resulting in a rematch against Husieva in the final. Clark scored two waza-ari, and before defeating Husieva with an ippon to win the gold medal once more.

References

Living people
Cuban female judoka
Paralympic judoka of Cuba
Year of birth missing (living people)
Medalists at the 2012 Summer Paralympics
Medalists at the 2016 Summer Paralympics
Paralympic medalists in judo
Paralympic gold medalists for Cuba
Judoka at the 2012 Summer Paralympics
Judoka at the 2016 Summer Paralympics
21st-century Cuban women